Rave@Moti is a shopping mall in the Indian city of Kanpur. The mall is spread over an area of 2.50 Lac sq. ft and commercially operational since May 2001
 The mall consists of three multiplexes by Adlabs, two restaurants, Tadka – Indian cuisine, Palate – Multicuisine, a banquet hall named Jalsaa, Food Court. The mall  The major attractions are Big Bazaar, Cafe Coffee Day, Domino's Pizza, Timeout game zone and Baba Biryani, a restaurant chain opened by the famous biryani joint of the city.

Location
The mall is situated in Rawatpur locality of the city and is situated just beside Rawatpur railway Station. Due to proximity to educational institutions of Kanpur like HBTI, IITK, Kanpur University, Indian Institute of Pulses Research, GSVM Medical College and Polytechnic the mall is usually crowded with youngsters and students.

Ownership
The mall is owned by Motilal Padampat Udyog and Rave Entertainment, a unit of Jagran Group beside other on lease.

References

Buildings and structures in Kanpur
Shopping malls in Uttar Pradesh
Shopping malls established in 2010
2010 establishments in Uttar Pradesh